You Can't Kill Us is the third studio album by American rock band Icon for Hire. Released on November 25, 2016, the album was released independently.

Background 

On March 15, 2016, the band announced a Kickstarter campaign for their third album, You Can't Kill Us. The album would be released throughout the year, with three new songs released to campaign backers every three months. The band raised $127,200, exceeding their initial goal of $2,016. "Supposed to Be" was released as the lead single from the album among its first group of releases, and received a music video on July 22, 2016, which was directed by Jamie Holt and included fans who donated to their Kickstarter campaign.

Track listing

Personnel 

Adapted from the album liner notes.

Icon for Hire
 Ariel - lead vocals, keyboards
 Shawn Jump - lead guitar, programming, producer

Additional musicians
 Cory O' Donoghue - guest vocals on "You Can't Kill Us"
 Brittany Egan - guest vocals on "You Can't Kill Us"
 Kerry Marley - guest vocals on "You Can't Kill Us"
 Adam Byerly - guest vocals on "You Can't Kill Us"
 Aaron James Halvorson - guest vocals on "You Can't Kill Us"

Production
 Mike Green - producer, mixer
 Kris Crummett - mastering
 Ford Fairchild - photography
 Kyle Crawford - layout, design

Chart performance

References 

2016 albums
Icon for Hire albums